The 2005 FIA WTCC Race Of Turkey was the eighth round of the 2005 World Touring Car Championship season. It was held at Istanbul Park. The first race was won by Fabrizio Giovanardi in an Alfa Romeo 1-2. Alfa Romeo finished 1-2 in the second race also, with Gabriele Tarquini emerging the victor.

Race 1

Race 2

Standings after the races

Drivers' Championship standings

Manufacturers' Championship standings

References

External links

Turkey
WTCC